Emanuela Menuzzo (born 1 August 1956) is an Italian former cyclist. She competed in the women's road race event at the 1984 Summer Olympics.

References

External links
 

1956 births
Living people
Italian female cyclists
Olympic cyclists of Italy
Cyclists at the 1984 Summer Olympics
Cyclists from Milan